One Day at a Time is a novel by Danielle Steel, published by Delacorte Press in February 2009. The book is Steel's seventy-seventh novel.

Synopsis
Coco Barrington, the wayward member of a family of Hollywood celebrities, agrees to dog-sit in her successful sister's house. There, she meets Leslie Baxter, a British actor hiding from a vindictive ex with his six-year-old girl. Following that encounter, Coco finds love but also reconciliation with the rest of her family, healing old wounds One Day at a Time.

List of characters

Coco Barrington
Daughter of a wealthy dramatic agent Buzz Barrington in Hollywood and a best-selling romance novelist mother Florence Flowers

Jane Barrington
Elder sister of Coco, a successful movie producer

Leslie Baxter
World-famous British movie star who happens to stay at Jane's house while Coco house-sits during her sister's absence

Ian White
Ex-lover of Coco who died and left his Australian shepherd, Sallie

Florence Flowers
Coco's mother, a successful novelist

Chloe
Daughter of Leslie, living with her mother Monica who is an ex-girlfriend of Leslie

Elizabeth
Jane's gay partner

Gabriel
Florence's young boyfriend

Footnotes
http://www.randomhouse.com/features/steel/bookshelf/display.pperl?isbn=9780385340298

2009 American novels
American romance novels
Novels by Danielle Steel
Delacorte Press books
Hollywood novels